Field Telegraph Corps, designation Ing 3, was a Swedish engineering unit within the Swedish Armed Forces which served in various forms between 1902 and 1937. The main part of the unit was located in the Stockholm Garrison in Stockholm, Uppland.

History
The Field Telegraph Corps was established in 1902 and was organized by the Fields Telegraph Company of the Svea Engineer Battalion, in connection with the battalion's reorganization into Svea Engineer Corps, together with a newly established Field Telegraph Company. The unit changed after a few years the designation to Ing 3. A detachment from the Field Telegraph Corps was during the years 1912-1916 deployed at Axevalla heath and Malmen and formed the backbone of the army air force. The detachment was reorganized in 1916 into the Field Telegraph Corps' 5th Company, the Air Company, which was deployed at Malmen from 1916 to 1926 when the Swedish Air Force was established.

In the Signal Workshop in Sundbyberg (Signalverkstaden i Sundbyberg, SIS) was included in the Field Telegraph Corps, which in 1940 added the newly established Defense Department's Engineering Committee (Försvarsväsendets verkstadsnämnd).

The Field Telegraph Corps was disbanded in 1937 and formed the backbone of the Signal Regiment (S 1).

1914 organisation
In accordance with the 1914 Defense Resolution the Field Telegraph Corps consisted of:

Staff based in Marieberg on Kungsholmen in Stockholm
2 Field Telegraph Companies
1 Park Company 
1 Ordnance Company 
1 Radio Company based at Järvafältet 
1 Balloon Company based at Järvafältet 
1 Air Company based at Malmslätt

Commanding officers
Commanders of the Field Telegraph Corps:

1902–1904: Nils Gustaf Stedt
1904–1910: Georg Frans Herman Julius Juhlin-Dannfelt
1907–1912: Broder Sten A:son Leijonhufvud
1912–1915: Adolf Murray
1915–1920: Karl Amundson
1920–1924: Conrad Erikson
1924–1925: Karl Amundson
1925–1928: Eggert Nauclér
1928–1932: Torsten Friis
1932–1937: Gottfried Hain

Names, designations and locations

References

Engineer corps of the Swedish Army
Military units and formations established in 1902
Military units and formations disestablished in 1937
Disbanded units and formations of Sweden
1902 establishments in Sweden
1937 disestablishments in Sweden
Stockholm Garrison